British and American actress Angela Lansbury was known for her prolific work in theatre, film and television.

Film

Television

Stage
Source: PlaybillVault

Radio

Video games

References

Further reading 

Actress filmographies
British filmographies